Ondes is a commune in the Haute-Garonne department in southwestern France near Toulouse.

Population

See also
Communes of the Haute-Garonne department

References

External links

Tourism office site

Communes of Haute-Garonne